Max Alexander Osaze Ojomoh (born 14 September 2000) is an English professional rugby union player who  plays as a  centre for Premiership club Bath Rugby.

Personal life
Max Ojomoh was born in Bath, Somerset on 14 September 2000. He is the son of former Bath Rugby and England player, Steve Ojomoh.

Ojomoh was educated at King Edward's School, Bath.

Club career
Ojomoh began his rugby career aged six at Bath Rugby before joining Chippenham RFC aged nine. He joined the Bath Rugby academy aged fourteen and in September 2019 made his club debut against Exeter Chiefs in the Premiership Rugby Cup. In March 2021 he made his first league appearance off the bench against London Irish and his maiden European outing followed a week later against Zebre Parma in the EPCR Challenge Cup.  He graduated from Bath Rugby's Academy to the senior squad in February 2022.

International career
In 2019 Ojomoh scored a try on his debut for the England under-18 team against France at Cheshunt RFC. The following year saw him gain four caps for the England under-20 team during the 2020 Six Nations Under 20s Championship.

In June 2021 Ojomoh received his first call-up to the senior England squad by coach Eddie Jones for a training camp.

References

2000 births
Living people
English rugby union players
Bath Rugby players
Rugby union centres
Rugby union players from Bath, Somerset
Black British sportspeople
English sportspeople of Nigerian descent
Alumni of the University of Bath
People educated at King Edward's School, Bath